Peter John Lewington (30 January 1950 – 31 July 2017) was an English cricketer. Lewington was a right-handed batsman who bowled right-arm off break. He was born at Finchampstead, Berkshire.

Early career and Warwickshire
He made his debut in County Cricket for Berkshire in the Minor Counties Championship against Dorset. Lewington represented the county in 12 Minor Counties matches for the county from 1967 to 1969.

In 1970, he joined Warwickshire where he made his first-class debut for the county against Cambridge University. His debut in the County Championship came in the same season against Somerset. From 1970 to 1982, he represented the county in 50 first-class matches, the last of which came against Worcestershire in the 1982 County Championship. In his 69 first-class matches for Warwickshire, he scored 376 runs at a batting average of 7.37, with a high score of 34. In the field he took 30 catches. With the ball he took 187 wickets for the county at a bowling average of 29.01, with 6 five wicket hauls and best figures of 7/52.

In 1973, Lewington made his List-A debut for the county against Northamptonshire in the 1971 John Player League. His second and final List-A match for Warwickshire came against the same opposition in the same competition in 1973.

DH Robins' XI in South Africa 1972/73
The apartheid policy followed by the South African Governments of the day meant that no Test match playing nation was willing to tour South Africa. Lewington was a member of DH Robins' XI January–February 1973 tour, with the team referred to as the "International Wanderers". During the tour he played 3 first-class matches against Western Province, Natal and Combined Section B XI. During the tour he took 4 wickets for the DH Robins' XI at an average of 69.75, with best figures of 2/56.

Return to Berkshire
While in his latter years at Warwickshire he rejoined his first county, Berkshire. In what would turn out to be a long association with Berkshire, he played 139 Minor Counties Championship matches from 1977 to 1996, the last of which came against Oxfordshire in the 1996 Minor Counties Championship. Lewington also made his debut in the MCCA Knockout Trophy for Berkshire against Norfolk in 1983. From 1983 to 1993, he represented the county in 16 Trophy matches, the last of which came against Hertfordshire.

He also represented Berkshire in List-A cricket, with his List-A debut for the county coming against Durham in the 1979 Gillette Cup. From 1979 to 1991, he represented the county 6 List-A matches, the last of which came against Hampshire in the 1991 NatWest Trophy. In 1978, he also played a single List-A match for Minor Counties West against Warwickshire in the 1978 Benson and Hedges Cup. In his combined List-A matches, he took 8 wickets at an average of 33.50, with best figures of 3/23.

Lewington died on 31 July 2017 at the age of 67.

References

External links
Peter Lewington at Cricinfo
Peter Lewington at CricketArchive

1950 births
2017 deaths
People from Finchampstead
English cricketers
Berkshire cricketers
Warwickshire cricketers
Minor Counties cricketers
D. H. Robins' XI cricketers